James Oldham (April 15, 1893 – April 21, 1930) was an American Negro league pitcher in the 1920s.

A native of Brownsville, Tennessee, Oldham made his Negro leagues debut in 1920 for the St. Louis Giants. He played for the club (renamed the "Stars" in 1922) for four seasons through 1923. Oldham died in St. Louis, Missouri in 1930 at age 37.

References

External links
 and Seamheads

1893 births
1930 deaths
St. Louis Giants players
St. Louis Stars (baseball) players
20th-century African-American sportspeople
Baseball pitchers